Château de Senonches was a castle in Senonches, in the french department of Eure-et-Loir.

History 
A castle existed since the 11th century. A new castle was built by Hugues II, lord of Châteauneuf-en-Thymerais on the site of the ruins of the castle.

Protection 
The castle is partially classified as Monument Historique (keep of the old castle) and partially registered (the two buildings to the east side of the keep).

References

See also 
 List of châteaux in Eure-et-Loir

Châteaux in Eure-et-Loir